Gelders Veenendaalse Voetbal Vereniging, better known as GVVV, is a Dutch football club.

It is one of seven football clubs from Veenendaal. GVVV's colors are blue-white.
GVVV plays its matches at Sportpark Panhuis. Since 2016, it plays in the Tweede Divisie.

Current squad 
As of 21 January 2023

Timeline 
1948/1949 champions 3e klasse UPVB
1954/1955 champions 2e klasse UPVB
1957/1958 champions 1e klasse UPVB
1958/1959 champions 4e klasse KNVB
1959/1960 champions 3e klasse KNVB
1969/1970 promotion 2e to 1e klasse KNVB
1975/1976 relegation to 2e klasse
1979/1980 champions 2e klasse C KNVB
1984/1985 champions 1e klasse B KNVB
1996/1997 champions hoofdklasse A KNVB
2003/2004 relegation to 1e klasse KNVB
2004/2005 champions 1e klasse C KNVB
2005/2006 winners regional KNVB-cup (West I)
2010/2011 winners Hoofdklasse B

References

External links 
GVVV Website 

Football clubs in the Netherlands
Football clubs in Utrecht (province)
Association football clubs established in 1947
1947 establishments in the Netherlands
Sport in Veenendaal